¡Mursday! is the self-titled debut album by American hip hop group ¡Mursday!, which consists of the group ¡Mayday! and rapper Murs. The album was released on June 10, 2014, by Strange Music.

Singles
The album's first single "Tabletops" was released on April 21, 2014. On May 1, 2014, the music video for "Tabletops" was released. On June 6, 2014, the music video for "Here" was released. On May 29, 2014, the music video for "Serge's Song" was released.

Critical response

¡MursDay! was met with generally positive reviews from music critics. David Jeffries of AllMusic gave the album four out of five stars, saying "If it didn't seem like destiny before, the Strange Music debut from Murs certifies that Tech N9ne's imprint is an ideal home for the alternative/underground/cult rapper. Besides that, teaming Murs with house band and genre-busters Mayday! is a brilliant idea, as the Strange freshman is eased into the scene with a sideline/collaborative release, but with both parties sharing a temperament that's hyperactive, ¡Mursday! comes off like a thrilling comic book team-up issue on wax." Rachel Chesbrough of XXL gave the album an L rating, saying "It lacks timelessness and may fade with the season it’s built to thrive in. That said, if you’re going to blend two coasts for a summer album, ¡MursDay! proves that there are no better cities than LA and Miami to get the job done." Thomas Quinlan of Exclaim! gave the album a seven out of ten, saying "While ¡Mursday! isn't "the most amazing music you've heard in the past, uh, 40 years," as claimed by Murs on "Intro," it is a great summertime album that should receive a lot of play throughout the season."

Commercial Performance
The album debuted at number 45 on the Billboard 200 chart, with first-week sales of 8,024 copies in the United States.

Track listing

Charts

References

2014 albums
Murs (rapper) albums
¡Mayday! albums
Collaborative albums